The 1996 Tour du Haut Var was the 28th edition of the Tour du Haut Var cycle race and was held on 24 February 1996. The race started in Draguignan and finished in Fréjus. The race was won by Bruno Boscardin.

General classification

References

1996
1996 in road cycling
1996 in French sport